Jeff Singer (born 31 March 1971) is a British drummer, currently for the bands My Dying Bride (2018–present), Soldierfield (2012–present) and Kill II This (who reformed in 2016), and formerly for the bands China Beach (1992–1994), Blaze (1999–2003), City of God (2004–2006) and Paradise Lost.

Singer auditioned to be in Paradise Lost in 1994 after Matthew Archer quit, but was not chosen – because of having a pink drum kit. In 2004, when Paradise Lost's drummer Lee Morris (the drummer who beat Singer in the Audition for the spot in the band in '94) quit, Singer was finally chosen to be in the band, which was conflicting for him as he was to be the drummer for another British Metal band Rise To Addiction, but committed to Paradise Lost just in time to play on the band's Forever After single, as the band were about to record it. Singer was not officially hired into the band until Paradise Lost's single The Enemy in 2007. Singer announced his departure from the band on 13 August 2008, just before a scheduled South American tour, because he wanted to be with his family and had an upcoming job. As a result, Paradise Lost had to cancel the South American tour dates they had planned, though they have since hired a new drummer, Adrian Erlandsson (At the Gates, Cradle of Filth), and reconfirmed the tour. There had been a few times that Singer filled in for Erlandsson on occasional Paradise Lost shows, when Erlandsson was unable to play for the band.

Discography

References

External links
 Interview on Paradise Lost website
 Jeff's Singer homepage

1971 births
Living people
British male drummers
Musicians from Manchester
Paradise Lost (band) members
21st-century drummers
21st-century British male musicians